Rusin is a surname. Notable people with the surname include:

 Brad Rusin (born 1986), American soccer player
 Chris Rusin (born 1986), American baseball player
 Kinga Rusin (born 1971), Polish television presenter
 Sergey Rusin (born 1959), Russian freestyle swimmer 
 Vladimir Rusin (born 1990), Russian badminton players

See also 
 Rusyn (surname)
 Russin (surname)

Slavic-language surnames